Seri Menanti (Jawi: سري مننتي; Negeri Sembilan Malay: Soghi Monanti) is a town, a mukim and a state assembly constituency in Kuala Pilah District, in central Negeri Sembilan, Malaysia, located 33 km northeast of the state capital city of Seremban and 14 km southwest of Kuala Pilah. It is the royal capital of the state of Negeri Sembilan and houses the seat of the Yang Di-Pertuan Besar of Negeri Sembilan or Yamtuan Besar, the ruler of the state of Negeri Sembilan. The royal palace is known as "Istana Besar". Seri Menanti also governs the surrounding chiefdoms (luak in local dialect) of Terachi, Gunung Pasir, Ulu Muar, Jempol and Inas, of which they are collectively known as Luak Tanah Mengandung.

History

The Minangkabau people moved to the wider area of Negeri Sembilan during the 14th century as part of the Minang practice of merantau. Around the 15th century they moved further inland from Rembau and explored an area what is known today as Seri Menanti. Among the explorers was Datuk Puteh of Pagar Ruyung. According to legend, they found three stalks of fresh green paddy and thus Datuk Puteh christened the area Padi Menanti (literally awaiting paddy). Over time the name changed to Seri Menanti. It is believed that the word "seri" means the Goddess of rice in the ancient Javanese tradition (in Javanese: Sri).

Raja Melewar arrived in Negeri Sembilan in 1773, installed and proclaimed as the first Yamtuan Besar in Kampung Penajis in Rembau. He later moved his palace to Seri Menanti which remains the royal town of Negeri Sembilan.

Notable and historical landmarks

The official palace of the Yang Di-Pertuan Besar Negeri Sembilan is the Istana Besar. The palace complex consists of the Main Palace, the Throne Room (Balairong Seri), and the Royal Banquet Hall. The Istana Besar was completed in 1932.

The old wooden palace, known as Istana Lama, was built and officiated during the reign of Yang Di-Pertuan Besar Tuanku Muhammad Shah ibni Almarhum Tuanku Antah (who reigned between 1888–1933). It is made in part of Chengal (Penak) wood Neobalanocarpus and ironwood or belian wood Eusideroxylon zwageri and held together using only wooden pegs. The palace took six years to build and was completed in 1908 at a cost of $45,000.00 at that time. The design has subtle hints of Minangkabau architecture, has five levels rising to a height of sixty-seven feet or approximately twenty meters high and has ninety-nine columns to support the main structure. The Istana Lama was a replacement for the Istana Pulih which was burned down by British soldiers. The drawings and plans for Istana Lama were detailed by Mr Woodford (Public Works Department) based on the designs provided by two local craftsmen, Kahar and Taib. This palace was used until 1932 after which the Yang Di-Pertuan Besar moved to the Istana Besar. The Istana Lama has been designated as a national heritage site and was converted into a Royal Museum in 1992.

Other landmarks include the Seri Menanti Royal Mausoleum, the Tuanku Munawir Royal Mosque (Masjid DiRaja Tuanku Munawir), the Seri Menanti Resort, and the eighteen-hole Royal Seri Menanti Golf and Country Club which also has two squash courts.

There is also the Ladang Alam Warisan located in Kampong Tengah which has horseback riding and horseback archery and lodging facilities.

Surrounding area

Among the villages in the area are Kampung Tanah Datar, Kampung Tengah, Kampung Gamin, Kampung Istana Lama, Kampung Sikai, Kampung Buyau, Kampung Batu Hampar, Kampung Mertang Seberang, Kampung Merual, Kampung Galau, Kampung Masjid Terbakar, Kampung Padang Biawas, Kampung Jumbang, Kampong Gunung Pasir and others. A few traditionally styled houses, a derivative of the Minangkabau design Rumah Gadang remain standing around Seri Menanti and in the adjacent villages. A significant portion of the land in Seri Menanti is Malay Reserve and Malay Customary Land or Tanah Adat.

Getting there
By Road

Seri Menanti located about 33.2 km from Seremban via  Jalan Seremban-Kuala Pilah (Route 51) with a right turn at the junction at Terachi on to N29. The town of Kuala Pilah is approximately 14 km away via route 51 and N24. The N24 continues to Senaling which is about 12 km away and connects on to Malaysia Federal Route 9 with Kuala Pilah (left turn), Johol and Tampin (right turn).

Local Services

The town consists of a row of wooden shophouses, a post office, a police station, a government clinic (Klinik Kesihatan), a general-purpose hall (Dewan Tunku Ampuan Najihah), a primary school SRK Tunku Laxamana Nasir and a secondary school SMK Tunku Besar Burhanuddin. There are several mosques in the Seri Menanti area.

 Masjid DiRaja Tuanku Munawir
 Masjid Lama Tanjung Beringin
 Masjid Gunung Pasir
 Masjid Kariah Kampong Parit Istana
 Masjid Kariah Sri Pliah

The Tunku Besar of Seri Menanti

The incumbent Tunku Besar of Seri Menanti is Tunku Ali Redhauddin, the eldest son of the Yang Di-Pertuan Besar of Negeri Sembilan Tuanku Muhriz ibni Almarhum Tuanku Munawir. The title of Tunku Besar Seri Menanti is the most senior of the Putera Yang Empat (Four Princes). This is the third time in 120 years that the Tunku Besar Seri Menanti has been appointed.

Local Events

January: Birthday day celebrations of the Yang Di-Pertuan Besar of Negeri Sembilan. Celebrations start with an honour guard held at the main field and an Investiture ceremony at the Istana Besar. There are also cultural and sporting events held to celebrate his birthday which has included soccer, cycling and golf. There are other events throughout the year. In March 2017, it was the site of the CIMB CYCLE @ SERI MENANTI 2017 which comprised the 120 km Endurance Route and 35 km Challenge Route.

Heritage
In February 2009, the Unity, Culture, Arts and Heritage Minister Datuk Seri Shafie Apdal announced that the Istana Lama Seri Menanti is among ten historical structures in Malaysia gazetted as a national heritage, along with Victoria Institution in Kuala Lumpur and The Stadthuys in Malacca.

See also
 Yamtuan Besar
 Adat perpatih
 Adat
 Royal capitals of Malaysian states

References

Kuala Pilah District
Towns in Negeri Sembilan
Mukims of Negeri Sembilan